Simon Faddoul (in Arabic: سيمون فضول; born 7 January 1958 in Dik El Mehdi, Lebanon) is the current Bishop of the Maronite Catholic Eparchy of the Annunciation since 2018.

Simon Faddoul was ordained to the priesthood on 9 August 1987in the Maronite Catholic Archeparchy of Antelias.

On January 13, 2014 he was appointed by Pope Francis Apostolic Exarch to Western and Central Africa (without conferring upon him the episcopal dignity) and Apostolic Visitor for Southern Africa. In 2018, the exarchy was elevated to an eparchy and Faddoul was ordained a bishop.

References

External links

 http://www.catholic-hierarchy.org/bishop/bfaddoul.html

1958 births
Lebanese Maronites
Living people
Maronite Catholic Apostolic Exarchs
Catholicism in Nigeria